Phosphatidylinositol 3-kinase-related kinases (PIKKs) are a family of Ser/Thr-protein kinases with sequence similarity to phosphatidylinositol-3 kinases (PI3Ks).

Members 

The human PIKK family includes six members:

Structure 

PIKKs proteins contain the following four domains:

 N-terminus FRAP-ATM- TRRAP (FAT) domain, 
  kinase domain (KD; PI3_PI4_kinase),
 PIKK- regulatory domain (PRD), and
 C-terminus FAT-C-terminal (FATC) domain

References

External links 
 Kinase Family PIKK at WikiKinome.

EC 2.7.11
Protein families